Political eras of the United States refer to a model of American politics used in history and political science to periodize the political party system existing in the United States.

The United States Constitution is silent on the subject of political parties. The Founding Fathers did not originally intend for American politics to be partisan. In Federalist Papers No. 9 and No. 10, Alexander Hamilton and James Madison, respectively, wrote specifically about the dangers of domestic political factions. In addition, the first President of the United States, George Washington, was not a member of any political party at the time of his election or throughout his tenure as president. Furthermore, he hoped that political parties would not be formed, fearing conflict and stagnation, as outlined in his Farewell Address.

First Party System 

The "First Party System" began in the 1790s with the 1792 re-election of George Washington and the 1796 election of John Adams, and ended in the 1820s with the presidential elections of 1824 and of 1828, resulting in Andrew Jackson's presidency.

George Washington's cabinet 

The beginnings of the American two-party system emerged from George Washington's immediate circle of advisers, which split into two camps:

 Federalists — John Adams and Alexander Hamilton emerged as  leaders of this camp.
 Democratic-Republicans — Thomas Jefferson and James Madison emerged as leaders of this camp.

Ironically, Hamilton and Madison wrote the Federalist Papers against political factions, but ended up being the core leaders in this emerging party system. Though distasteful to the participants, by the time John Adams and Thomas Jefferson ran for president in 1796, partisanship in the United States came to being.

Era of Good Feelings 

The disastrous Panic of 1819 and the Supreme Court's McCulloch v. Maryland reanimated the disputes over the supremacy of state sovereignty and federal power, between strict construction of the US Constitution and loose construction.
The Missouri Crisis in 1820 made the explosive political conflict between slave and free soil open and explicit.
Only through the adroit handling of the legislation by Speaker of the House Henry Clay was a settlement reached and disunion avoided.

Jacksonian democracy 

"Jacksonian democracy" is a term to describe the 19th-century political philosophy that originated with the seventh U.S. president, The United States presidential election of 1824 brought partisan politics to a fever pitch, with General Andrew Jackson 's popular vote victory (and his plurality in the United States Electoral College being overturned in the United States House of Representatives).

With the decline in political consensus, it became imperative to revive Jeffersonian principles on the basis of Southern exceptionalism.
The agrarian alliance, North and South, would be revived to form Jacksonian Nationalism and the rise of the Democratic-Republican Party.  As a result, the Democratic-Republican Party split into the Jacksonian faction, which became the modern Democratic Party in the 1830s, and the Henry Clay faction, which was absorbed by Clay's Whig Party. The term "Jacksonian democracy" was in active use by the 1830s.

Second Party System 

Many historians and political scientists use "Second Party System" to describe American politics between the mid-1820s until the mid-1850s.  The system was demonstrated by rapidly rising levels of voter interest (with high election day turnouts), rallies, partisan newspapers, and high degrees of personal loyalty to parties. It was in full swing with the 1828 United States presidential election, since the Federalists shrank to a few isolated strongholds and the Democratic-Republicans lost unity during the buildup to the American Civil War. describe the  operating in the United States.  

The political party system of the United states was dominated by two major parties:

 The Jacksonian Democrats led by Andrew Jackson. The Jacksonian Democrats stood for the "sovereignty of the people" as expressed in popular demonstrations, constitutional conventions, and majority rule as a general principle of governing, 
 The Whig Party, assembled by Henry Clay from the National Republicans and from other opponents of Jackson. Whigs advocated the rule of law, written and unchanging constitutions, and protections for minority interests against majority tyranny.

After taking office in 1829, President Andrew Jackson restructured a number of federal institutions. Jackson's professed philosophy became the nation's dominant political worldview for the remainder of the 1830s, helping his vice president (Martin Van Buren) secure election in the presidential election of 1836. In the presidential election of 1840, the "Whig Party" had its first national victory with the election of General William Henry Harrison, but he died shortly after assuming office in 1841. John Tyler (a self-proclaimed "Democrat") succeeded Harrison, as the first Vice President of the United States to ascend to the presidency via death of the incumbent.

Minor parties of the era included:

 the Anti-Masonic Party, an important innovator from 1827 to 1834
 the abolitionist Liberty Party in 1840
 the anti-slavery expansion Free Soil Party in 1848 and 1852.

Third Party System 

The "Third Party System" refers to the period which came into focus in the 1850s (during the leadup to the American Civil War) and ended in the 1890s. The issues of focus during this time: Slavery, the civil war, Reconstruction, race, and monetary issues. 

It was dominated by the new Republican Party, which claimed success in saving the Union, abolishing slavery and enfranchising the freedmen, while adopting many Whig-style modernization programs such as national banks, railroads, high tariffs, homesteads, social spending (such as on greater Civil War veteran pension funding), and aid to land grant colleges. While most elections from 1876 through 1892 were extremely close, the opposition Democrats won only the 1884 and 1892 presidential elections (the Democrats also won the popular vote in the 1876 and 1888 presidential elections, but lost the electoral college vote), though from 1875 to 1895 the party usually controlled the United States House of Representatives and controlled the United States Senate from 1879-1881 and 1893-1895. Indeed, some scholars emphasize that the 1876 election saw a realignment and the collapse of support for Reconstruction. The northern and western states were largely Republican, except for the closely balanced New York, Indiana, New Jersey, and Connecticut. After 1876, the Democrats took control of the "Solid South".

Historians and political scientists generally believe that the Third Party System ended in the mid-1890s, which featured profound developments in issues of American nationalism, modernization, and race. This period, the later part of which is often termed the Gilded Age, is defined by its contrast with the preceding and following eras.

Fourth Party System 

The "Fourth Party System" is the term used in political science and history for the period in American political history from the mid-1890s to the early 1930s, It was dominated by the Republican Party, excepting when 1912 split in which Democrats (led by President Woodrow Wilson) held the White House for eight years. American history texts usually call the period the Progressive Era. The concept was introduced under the name "System of 1896" by E. E. Schattschneider in 1960, and the numbering scheme was added by political scientists in the mid-1960s.

The era began in the severe depression of 1893 and the extraordinarily intense election of 1896. It included the Progressive Era, World War I, and the start of the Great Depression. The Great Depression caused a realignment that produced the Fifth Party System, dominated by the Democratic New Deal Coalition until the 1970s.

The central domestic issues concerned government regulation of railroads and large corporations ("trusts"), the money issue (gold versus silver), the protective tariff, the role of labor unions, child labor, the need for a new banking system, corruption in party politics, primary elections, the introduction of the federal income tax, direct election of senators, racial segregation, efficiency in government, women's suffrage, and control of immigration. Foreign policy centered on the 1898 Spanish–American War, Imperialism, the Mexican Revolution, World War I, and the creation of the League of Nations. Dominant personalities included presidents William McKinley (R), Theodore Roosevelt (R), and Woodrow Wilson (D), three-time presidential candidate William Jennings Bryan (D), and Wisconsin's progressive Republican Robert M. La Follette, Sr.

The Fourth Party System ended with the Great Depression, a worldwide economic depression that started in 1929. A few years after the Wall Street Crash of 1929, Herbert Hoover lost the 1932 United States presidential election to Franklin D. Roosevelt.

Later systems 
The later party systems (with periods indicated in parenthesis) include:

Fifth Party System (1932–1976)
Sixth Party System (1980–present)
Seventh Party System (present or future)

References

Further reading 
  Cited in 
 
 
 
 

Political history of the United States
History of the United States by topic